Douglas (occasionally spelt Douglass) is a common surname of Scottish origin, thought to derive from the Scottish Gaelic dubh glas, meaning "black stream". There are numerous places in Scotland from which the surname is derived. The surname has developed into the given name Douglas. Douglas is a habitational name, which could be derived from any of the many places so-named. While there are numerous places with this name in Scotland, it is thought, in most cases, to refer to Douglas, South Lanarkshire, the location of Douglas Castle, the chief stronghold of the Lords of Douglas. According to George Fraser Black, in southern Argyllshire the surname is an Anglicised form of the surnames MacLucas, MacLugash (which are derived from the Gaelic Mac Lùcais).

Arts

Visual arts
 Aaron Douglas (artist) (1900–1979), American artist
 Andrew Douglas (born 1952), British photographer/director
 Haldane Douglas (1892–1980), American art director
 Jessie O. Douglas (1856-19??), British artist
 John Douglas (English architect) (1830–1911), English architect
 John Douglas (Scottish architect) (died 1778)
 Malcolm Douglas (illustrator) (1954–2009), British illustrator
 Mel Douglas (born 1978), Australian glass artist
 Sholto Johnstone Douglas (1871–1958), Scottish artist known as Sholto Douglas or Robert Sholto Johnstone Douglas
 Stan Douglas (born 1960), Canadian artist
 Stuart Douglas (born 1962), British photographer/director

Literature
 Lord Alfred Douglas (1870–1945), British poet
 Alice May Douglas (1865–1943), American poet, author, editor
 Amanda Minnie Douglas (1831–1916), American writer of children's stories
 Carole Nelson Douglas (1944–2021), American writer
 Colin Douglas (novelist) (born 1945), pseudonym of Colin Thomas Currie, Scottish novelist
 David John Douglass, British political activist and writer
 Ellen Douglas (1921–2012), born Josephine Ayres Haxton, American author
 Gavin Douglas (1474–1522), Scottish poet and bishop
 Geoffrey Douglas (born 1944), American author and journalist
 Helen Douglas Irvine (1880–1947), Scottish novelist, historian and translator 
 Jack Douglas (writer) (1908–1989), American comedy writer
 J. Yellowlees Douglas, American author of hypertext fiction
 John Douglas (bishop of Salisbury) (1721–1807), Scottish man of letters and Anglican bishop
 John E. Douglas (born 1945), American criminal profiler and writer
 Keith Douglas (1920–1944), English poet of World War II
 Marjory Stoneman Douglas (1890–1998), American conservationist and writer
 Max Douglas (born 1970), Canadian comic book creator
 Michael Douglas (pen name Michael Crichton), American author
 Myra Douglas (1844–?), American writer, poet
 Norman Douglas (1868–1952), British writer
 Orville Lloyd Douglas (born 1976), Canadian essayist, poet, and writer
 Mark Douglas-Home (born 1951), Scottish editor-in-chief of The Herald in Glasgow, Scotland
 William Douglas-Home (1912–1992), British playwright

Music

 Alan Douglas (record producer), American record producer
 Ashanti (entertainer) (Ashanti Shequoiya Douglas) (born 1980), American R&B singer
 Barry Douglas (pianist) (born 1960), Northern Irish classical pianist and conductor
 Carl Douglas (born 1942), Jamaican-born singer
 Carol Douglas (born 1948), American singer
 Charles Douglass (1910–2003), American sound engineer
 Chip Douglas (Douglas Farthing Hatlelid, born 1942), American songwriter, musician, and record producer
 Chris Douglas (born 1974), American musician
 Craig Douglas (born 1941), English singer
 Dave Douglas (drummer), American drummer
 Dave Douglas (trumpeter) (born 1963), American jazz composer and trumpeter
 Jahméne Douglas, English singer, contestant of The X Factor (UK), series 9
 James Douglas (composer) (1932–2022), Scottish composer
 Jenny Douglas (born 1991), Scottish singer and actress
 Jerry Douglas (born 1955), American country music and bluegrass musician
 Jimmy Douglass, American record producer
 John Douglas, drummer for English band Anathema
 Johnny Douglas (conductor) (1920–2003), English composer, musical director and conductor
 K. C. Douglas (1913–1975), American blues musician
 Roy Douglas (1907–2015), British composer, pianist and arranger
 Steve Douglas (saxophonist) (1938–1993), American saxophonist, flautist and clarinetist
 Tom Douglas (songwriter), American country music songwriter
 Tony Douglas (singer) (1929–2013), American country music singer

Stage, screen, and radio

 Aaron Douglas (actor) (born 1971), Canadian actor
 Angela Douglas (born Angela McDonagh in 1940), English actress
 Bill Douglas (1934–1991), Scottish film director
 Cameron Douglas (born 1978), American actor and drug dealer
 Christopher Douglas (born c. 1955), United Kingdom actor and writer
 Clare Douglas, British film editor
 Colin Douglas (actor) (1912–1991), British stage and television actor
 D. C. Douglas (born 1966), American actor and director
 Don Douglas (1905–1945), Scottish film actor
 Donald Douglas (Scottish actor) (born 1933), British actor
 Donna Douglas (1933–2015), American actress
 Eric Douglas (1958–2004), American actor, son of Kirk Douglas
 Gordon Douglas (director) (1907–1993), American actor and director
 Hal Douglas (1924–2014), American voice actor
 Hazel Douglas, British actress
 Illeana Douglas (born 1965), American actress
 Jack Douglas (actor) (1927–2008), English actor
 James Douglas (actor) (1929-2016), American soap opera actor
 Jason Douglas, American stage, film, and voice actor
 Jeff Douglas (born 1971), Canadian actor and broadcaster
 Joanna Douglas (born 1983), Canadian actress
 Joel Douglas (born January 23, 1947), American movie producer, son of Kirk Douglas and Diana Dill
 Kirk Douglas (1916–2020), American actor, producer, director, and author
 Kyan Douglas (born 1970), American cosmetologist
 Malcolm Douglas (1941–2010), Australian wildlife documentary film maker, and crocodile hunter.
 Melvyn Douglas (1901–1981), American actor
 Michael Douglas (born 1944), American actor and producer, son of Kirk Douglas and Diana Dill
 Michael Keaton, born Michael John Douglas (born 1951), American actor
 Mike Douglas (1925–2006), American entertainer and former TV talk-show host
 Paul Douglas (actor) (1907–1959), American actor
 Paul Douglas (cameraman) (1958–2006), British CBS News cameraman
 Pavel Douglas (born 1951), Polish-born, British-based actor
 Peter Douglas (born 1955), American television and film producer, son of Kirk Douglas
 Robert Douglas (actor) (1909–1999), stage and film actor, television director and producer
 Róbert Ingi Douglas (born 1973), Icelandic film director
 Sam Douglas (born 1957), British/American film, stage and video game actor
 Sarah Douglas (actress) (born 1952), English actress
 Sharon Douglas (1920–2016), American film and radio actress
 Shirley Douglas (1934–2020), Canadian actress, former wife of Donald Sutherland, mother of Kiefer Sutherland
 Steve Douglas (sportscaster), Canadian sportscaster
 Suzzanne Douglas (1957–2021), American film, television and stage actress
 Saba Douglas-Hamilton (born 1970), television presenter and naturalist
 Vivien Endicott-Douglas (born 1990), Canadian actress
 Martha Howe-Douglas, British actress

Business
 Donald Wills Douglas Sr. (1892–1981), American-born Scottish businessman, founder of Douglas Aircraft
 Donald Wills Douglas Jr. (1917–2004), American businessman, son of Donald Wills Douglas Sr.
 Gustaf Douglas (born 1938), Swedish businessman, vice chairman and largest single shareholder in security firm Securitas AB
 James Douglas (businessman) (1867–1949), Canadian mining engineer and businessman
 James Douglas Jr. (1868–1949), Canadian-born American businessman and mining executive in Canada, US and Mexico
 Louis Douglas (1889–1939), American dancer, choreographer, and music businessman
 Raymond E. Douglas (1948–2007), executive for The New York Times
 Walter Donald Douglas (1861–1912), American businessman and Titanic casualty

Law
 Andrew Grant Douglas (1932–2021), Republican justice of the Ohio Supreme Court
 Byrd Douglas (1894–1965), American college baseball and football coach as well as a judge
 Charles Gywnne "Chuck" Douglas III (born 1942), trial lawyer and a former United States Representative
 John Brown Douglas (c. 1855 – 1935), British professor of Roman law
 Lori Douglas, Manitoba judge
 Robert Dick Douglas (1875–1960), American lawyer and son of Robert M. Douglas
 Robert M. Douglas (1849–1917), American judge, North Carolina Supreme Court justice
 Samuel Douglas (1781–1833), Pennsylvania lawyer and state attorney general
 Wallace B. Douglas (1852–1930), American judge, Minnesota Supreme Court justice and Minnesota Attorney General
 William O. Douglas (1898–1980), American associate justice of the Supreme Court

Military
 Captain Andrew Snape Douglas (1761–1797), Scottish sea captain in the Royal Navy
 Sir Archibald Lucius Douglas (1842–1913), Canadian officer of the British Navy
 Lt. Col. Campbell Mellis Douglas (1840–1909), Canadian recipient of the Victoria Cross
 Rear-Admiral Sir Charles Douglas, 1st Baronet of Carr, officer in the Royal Navy
 General Sir Charles W. H. Douglas (1850–1914), Chief of the Imperial General Staff (CIGS)
 Admiral George Henry Douglas (1821–1905), British naval officer
 Henry Kyd Douglas (1838–1903), Confederate States Army officer
 General Sir Howard Douglas (1776–1861), British general and colonial administrator
 Admiral James Douglas, (abt 1755–1839), British naval officer
 Sir James Douglas, Lord of Douglas (James 'the Good', 1286–1330), Scottish soldier and knight in the Scottish wars of independence
 Sir James Douglas, 1st Baronet (1703–1787), Commodore for Newfoundland and Labrador
 James H. Douglas Jr. (1899–1988), United States Secretary of the Air Force and United States Deputy Secretary of Defense
 James Postell Douglas: Confederate Captain of the First Texas Artillery Battery, farmer, founder of the Tyler Tap Railroad, and president of the Texas and Gulf Short Line Railroad
 Lord James Douglas (1617–1645), son of the 1st Marquess of Douglas
 Sir John Douglas (died 1814), Royal Marine officer
General Sir John Douglas of Glenfinart (1817–1888), Commander of the troops in the North British District
 Admiral John Erskine Douglas (c. 1758 – 1847), British naval officer
 Admiral John Leigh Douglas (1741–1810), British naval officer
 Major-General John Primrose Douglas (1908–1975), Honorary Surgeon to the Queen
 Lieutenant-General Sir Kenneth MacKenzie Douglas, 1st Baronet of Glenbervie (1754–1833), born Kenneth MacKenzie
 Matthew Douglas, 7th Laird of Mains (c. 1519 – after 1571), Scottish soldier
 Lt. Col. Montagu William Douglas (1863–1957), British soldier and colonial administrator in India
 Lt. General Sir Neil Douglas (1779/80–1853)
 Vice-Admiral Sir Percy Douglas (1876–1939), British naval officer, Hydrographer of the Navy
 Admiral Peter John Douglas (1787–1858), British naval officer
 Admiral Robert Gordon Douglas (1829–1910), British Royal Navy officer, Admiral Superintendent of Malta Dockyard in 1887.
 Field Marshal Robert Douglas (1727–1809), Scottish-born career soldier and field marshal of the Netherlands
 Admiral Sholto Douglas, (1833–1913), British naval officer
 Marshal of the Royal Air Force Sholto Douglas, 1st Baron Douglas of Kirtleside (1893–1969), British air force officer
 Brigadier General Sir Thomas Monteath Douglas (1788–1868), army officer in the East India Company
 Major-General Sir William Douglas KCMG, CB, DSO (13 August 1858 – 1920) 
 Col. William Douglas of Balgillo ( 1778–1818), British Army officer during the Napoleonic Wars
 William Douglas of Fingland (1672 – c. 1760), Scottish soldier
 Brigadier-General William Douglas of Kirkness (c. 1690 – 1747), Member of Parliament and soldier
 Major General Sir William Douglas of Bonjedward and Timpendean (1770–1834), British Army officer
 Lt. Col. Angus Falconer Douglas-Hamilton (1863–1915), Scottish soldier and posthumous recipient of the Victoria Cross
 Admiral Lord Charles Montagu Douglas Scott (1839–1911), Commander-in-Chief, Plymouth
 Admiral The Honourable Sir Cyril Douglas-Pennant (1894–1961), Commander-in-Chief, The Nore
 General Count Archibald Douglas-Stjernorp, Swedish military
 Violet Douglas-Pennant (1865–1945), British philanthropist and commandant of the Women's Royal Air Force

Nobility

 Agnes Douglas, Countess of Argyll (1574–1607), Scottish noblewoman
 Archibald I, Lord of Douglas (died c. 1238), Scottish nobleman
 Sir Archibald Douglas (died 1333) (k. 1333), Guardian of Scotland, leader of Scots army at Halidon Hill
 Archibald Douglas, 1st Duke of Douglas (1694–1761), Scottish nobleman
 Archibald Douglas, 1st Earl of Forfar (1653–1712), Scottish peer
 Archibald Douglas, 1st Earl of Ormond (1609–1655), Scottish Earl of Angus
 Archibald Douglas, 2nd Earl of Forfar (1692–1715
 Archibald Douglas, 3rd Earl of Douglas (Archibald the Grim, c. 1328–1400), Scottish nobleman
 Archibald Douglas, 4th Earl of Douglas (1372–1424), Scottish nobleman and warlord, Duke of Touraine
 Archibald Douglas, 5th Earl of Douglas (1390–1439), Scottish nobleman, de jure Duke of Touraine
 Archibald Douglas, 5th Earl of Angus (1453–1514), warden of the east marches
 Archibald Douglas, 6th Earl of Angus (1490–1557)
 Archibald Douglas, 8th Earl of Angus and 5th Earl of Morton (1556–1588)
 Archibald Douglas, 8th Marquess of Queensberry (1818–1858)
 Archibald Douglas of Glenbervie, Scottish nobleman
 Archibald Douglas of Kilspindie (1475–1536), known as Greysteil
 Andrew Douglas of Hermiston (died before 1277)
 Charles Douglas, 5th Lord Mordington (died after 1746)
 Charles Douglas, 6th Marquess of Queensberry (1777–1837), great-great-great-great-grandson of the 1st Earl of Queensberry
 Charles Douglas, 3rd Duke of Queensberry and 2nd Duke of Dover (1698–1778)
 David Douglas, 7th Earl of Angus (c. 1515 – 1558), grandson of George, Master of Douglas
 David Douglas, 12th Marquess of Queensberry (born 1929)
 Dunbar Douglas, 4th Earl of Selkirk (1722–1799), grandnephew of 3rd Earl of Selkirk
 Dunbar Douglas, 6th Earl of Selkirk (1809–1885)
 Elizabeth Douglas, Countess of Erroll (died 1631)
 Frances Douglas, Lady Douglas (1750–1817), wife of Archibald Douglas, 1st Baron Douglas
 Francis Douglas, 11th Marquess of Queensberry (1896–1954), son of the 10th Marquess of Queensberry
 George Douglas, 1st Earl of Angus (1378–1402)
 George Douglas, 4th Earl of Angus (1429–1462)
 George Douglas, Master of Angus (1469–1513)
 George Douglas, 13th Earl of Morton (1662–1738), younger brother of the 12th Earl of Morton
 George Douglas, 16th Earl of Morton (1761–1827)
 George Douglas, 17th Earl of Morton (1789–1858), grandson of the 14th Earl of Morton
 Henry Douglas, Earl of Drumlanrig (1722.1754), son of Charles Douglas, 3rd Duke of Queensberry, 2nd Duke of Dover and a soldier
 Hugh the Dull, Lord of Douglas (1294–1342/1346)
 James Douglas, 2nd Earl of Douglas (1358–1388), influential lord in the Kingdom of Scotland
 James Douglas, 7th Earl of Douglas (1371–1443)
 James Douglas, 1st Lord Dalkeith (born after 1372, died before 22 May 1441)
 James Douglas, 9th Earl of Douglas (1426–1488)
 James Douglas, 1st Earl of Morton (died 1493)
 James Douglas, 3rd Earl of Angus (1426)–1446
 James Douglas, 3rd Earl of Morton (died 1548)
 James Douglas, 7th Baron Drumlanrig (died 1578), son of the 6th Baron Drumlanrig
 James Douglas, 4th Earl of Morton (c. 1525 – 1581), younger brother of 7th Earl of Angus; the last of the four regents of Scotland during the minority of King James VI
 James Douglas, 2nd Marquess of Douglas (1646–1699)
 James Douglas, 3rd Marquess of Queensberry (1697–1715), lunatic and cannibal
 James Douglas, Earl of Angus (1671–1692), Scottish nobleman and soldier, son of the previous
 James Douglas, 2nd Duke of Queensberry and 1st Duke of Dover (1662–1711)
 James Douglas, 14th Earl of Morton (c. 1703 – 1768)
 John Douglas, 2nd Earl of Morton (died 1513)
 John Douglas, 7th Marquess of Queensberry (1779–1856), younger brother of the 6th Marquess of Queensberry
 John Douglas, 9th Marquess of Queensberry (1844–1900), Scottish nobleman
 John Douglas, 21st Earl of Morton (1927–2016), grandson of the 19th Earl of Morton
 John Douglas, Lord of Balvenie (c. 1433 – 1463), son of James Douglas, 7th Earl of Douglas
 Margaret, Duchess of Douglas
 Margaret Douglas (1515–1578), the daughter of Archibald Douglas, 6th Earl of Angus, and Margaret Tudor
 Margaret Douglas, Fair Maid of Galloway (died c. 1474), Scottish noblewoman, a member of the Black Douglas family
 Percy Douglas, 10th Marquess of Queensberry (1868–1920), son of the 9th Marquess of Queensberry
 Robert Douglas, 8th Earl of Morton (died 1649), son of the 7th Earl of Morton
 Robert Douglas, Viscount Belhaven(executed 1584), Gentlemen of the Bedchamber
 Sholto Douglas (d.unknown), mythical progenitor of the House of Douglas
 Sholto Douglas, 19th Earl of Morton (1844–1935), son of the 18th Earl of Morton
 Sholto Douglas, 15th Earl of Morton (1732–1774)
 Stewart Sholto Douglas, 22nd Earl of Morton (born 1952)
 Thomas Douglas, 5th Earl of Selkirk (1771–1820), Scottish philanthropist who sponsored immigrant settlements in Canada
 William I, Lord of Douglas (died c. 1214)
 William Longleg, Lord of Douglas (c. 1220 – c. 1274), Scoto-Norman nobleman
 William the Hardy, Lord of Douglas (c. 1240 – 1299), Governor of Berwick Castle, Scottish warrior and freedom-fighter
 William IV, Lord of Douglas (died 1333)
 William Douglas, Lord of Liddesdale (c. 1300 – 1353)
 William Douglas, 1st Earl of Douglas (died 1384)
 William Douglas, 1st Baron Drumlanrig (died 1427), illegitimate son of the 2nd Earl of Douglas
 William Douglas, 2nd Earl of Angus (c. 1398 – 1437)
 William Douglas, 6th Earl of Douglas (c. 1424 – 1440)
 William Douglas, 8th Earl of Douglas (1425–1452)
 William Douglas, 9th Earl of Angus (died 1571)
 William Douglas, 6th Earl of Morton (1540–1606)
 William Douglas, 9th Earl of Morton (died bef 1 Nov 1681)
 William Douglas, 10th Earl of Angus (1553–1611)
 William Douglas, 1st Earl of Queensberry (c. 1582 – 1640)
 William Douglas, 7th Earl of Morton (1582–1648)
 William Douglas, 1st Marquess of Douglas (1590–1660), son of the 10th Earl of Angus
 William Douglas, 1st Duke of Queensberry (1637–1695), Scottish politician
 William Douglas, 4th Duke of Queensberry (1724–1810), son of 2nd Earl of March
 William Douglas of Cluny (c. 1428 – c. 1475), guardian to King James III of Scotland
 William Douglas of Glenbervie (c. 1473 – 1513)
 Alexander Douglas-Hamilton, 10th Duke of Hamilton (1767–1852), Scottish politician
 Angus Douglas-Hamilton, 15th Duke of Hamilton (1938–2010)
 Alexander Douglas-Hamilton, 16th Duke of Hamilton (born 1978)
 Alfred Douglas-Hamilton, 13th Duke of Hamilton and 9th Earl of Selkirk (1862–1940)
 Douglas Douglas-Hamilton, 8th Duke of Hamilton (1756–1799)
 Douglas Douglas-Hamilton, 14th Duke of Hamilton (1903–1973), aviator, politician and landowner
 Frank Douglas-Pennant, 5th Baron Penrhyn (1865–1967)
 George Douglas-Hamilton, 10th Earl of Selkirk (1906–1994), younger son of the 13th Duke of Hamilton
 George Douglas-Pennant, 2nd Baron Penrhyn (1836–1907), landowner who played a prominent part in the Welsh slate industry
 Hugh Douglas-Pennant, 4th Baron Penrhyn (1894–1949)
 James Douglas-Hamilton, Baron Selkirk of Douglas (briefly 11th Earl of Selkirk) (born 1942), younger son of the 14th Duke of Hamilton and Brandon
 Malcolm Douglas-Pennant, 6th Baron Penrhyn (1908–2003), Welsh peer, soldier, rifleman, and farmer
 Lady Mary Victoria Douglas-Hamilton (1850–1922)
 Muriel Douglas-Pennant (1869–1962), Speaker of the House of Commons
 Nina Douglas-Hamilton, Duchess of Hamilton and Brandon (1878–1951), the daughter of Major Robert Poore
 William Douglas-Hamilton, Duke of Hamilton and 1st Earl of Selkirk (1635–1694)
 William Douglas-Hamilton, 12th Duke of Hamilton and 8th Earl of Selkirk (1845–1895)
 David Douglas-Home, 15th Earl of Home (1943–2022), heir general to the House of Douglas
 Cospatrick Douglas-Home, 11th Earl of Home (1799–1881), Scottish diplomat and politician
 Rachel Douglas-Home, 27th Baroness Dacre (1929–2012), English peeress
 James Hamilton, 4th Duke of Hamilton (1658–1712), eldest son of William Douglas, Duke of Hamilton and his wife Anne
 Henry Douglas-Scott-Montagu, 1st Baron Montagu of Beaulieu (1832–1905), British Conservative politician
 Alice Christabel Montagu Douglas Scott (1901–2004), Princess Alice, Duchess of Gloucester
 Louisa Montagu Douglas Scott, Duchess of Buccleuch 1836–1912, wife of 6th Duke of Buccleuch
 Mary Montagu Douglas Scott, Duchess of Buccleuch (1900–1993), wife of 8th Duke of Buccleuch 
 Richard Walter John Montagu Douglas Scott, 10th Duke of Buccleuch (Born 1954)
 Simon Douglas-Pennant, 7th Baron Penrhyn, (Born 1938) 
 Walter Montagu Douglas Scott, 5th Duke of Buccleuch (1806–1884), British politician and nobleman
 Walter Montagu Douglas Scott, 8th Duke of Buccleuch (1894–1973), a politician and Conservative peer

Politics

 Sir Adye Douglas (1815–1906), Australian lawyer and politician, and first class cricketer
 Albert B. Douglas (1912–1971), Canadian MP
 Alec Douglas-Home (1903–1995), British baron, politician, and prime minister
 Alexander Douglas (Orkney and Shetland), MP for Orkney and Shetland, Scotland
 Archibald Douglas, 1st Baron Douglas (1748–1827), Member of Parliament for Forfarshire
 Archibald Douglas, 13th of Cavers (died 1741), Receiver-general for Scotland and MP for Dumfries Burghs
 Archibald Douglas (1707–1778) (Lt Gen Archibald Douglas of Kirkton), MP for Dumfriesshire, Scotland
 Benjamin Douglas (1816–1894), Lieutenant Governor of Connecticut
 Beverly B. Douglas (1822–1878), Virginian politician
 Boyd Douglas (born 1950), politician in Northern Ireland
 Charles Douglas, 3rd Baron Douglas (1775–1848), MP for Lanarkshire, and a cricketer
 Charles Douglas (mayor) (1852–1917), Mayor of Vancouver
 Charles Douglas III (born 1942), U.S. Representative from New Hampshire and New Hampshire Supreme Court Associate Justice
 Charles Eurwicke Douglas 1806–1887, English MP
 Charles Mackinnon Douglas (1865–1924), Liberal MP for North West Lanarkshire
 Curtis N. Douglas (1856–1919), New York politician
 Denzil Douglas (born 1953), Prime Minister of St Kitts and Nevis
 Dick Douglas (1932–2014), Scottish politician
 Emily Taft Douglas (1899–1994), American politician, wife of Paul Douglas (below)
 Francis Douglas, Viscount Drumlanrig (1867–1894), a Scottish nobleman and Liberal politician
 Fred J. Douglas (1869–1949), United States Representative
 Frederick Douglass (1818–1895), American abolitionist, editor, orator, author, statesman, and reformer
 Helen Gahagan Douglas (1900–1980), American actress and politician
 Hezekiah Ford Douglas (1831–1865), American abolitionist, traveling speaker, political organizer, and newspaper proprietor
 Hima Douglas, Niuean politician
 Ian Douglas (politician), attorney and politician from Dominica
 James Douglas (governor) (1803–1877), Scottish-Canadian governor of the colony of Vancouver Island
 James G. Douglas (1887–1984), Irish senator
 James Henry Douglas (died 1905), Australian politician
 James W. Douglas (1851–1883), British Columbian politician
 Janet Douglas (diplomat) (born 1960), British diplomat and ambassador
 Jim Douglas (born 1952), American politician
 John Douglas Sr. (born c. 1636), Maryland, US, politician
 John Douglas (died 1838) (c. 1774 – 1838), MP for Orford and Minehead, England
 Sir John Douglas, 3rd Baronet of Kelhead (c. 1708 – 1778), MP for Dumfriesshire
 John Douglas (Queensland politician) (1828–1904), Premier of Queensland, Australia
 John Douglas of Broughton (died 1832), Scottish politician
 John Henry Douglas (1851–1930), Canadian politician and farmer
 John St Leger Douglas (died 1783, MP for Hindon and Weobly
 Lewis Williams Douglas (1894–1974), American politician, diplomat, businessman and academic
 Lincoln Douglas, MP, Trinidad and Tobago Parliament politician
 Count Ludvig Douglas, riksmarskalk and Minister of Foreign Affairs of Sweden, peer of the Grand Duchy of Baden
 Malcolm Douglas (born 1941), New Zealand politician of the Labour Party
 Mark Douglas (Wisconsin) (1829–1900), American politician
 Michael Douglas (politician), (1940–1992), Dominican politician
 Paul Douglas (1892–1976), American economist and United States Senator from Illinois
 Robert Douglas (New Zealand politician), 19th-century New Zealand MP
 Robert van Breugel Douglas (1791–1873), 19th-century Dutch member of the Council of State and Publicist.
 Roger Douglas (born 1937), former New Zealand politician
 Rosie Douglas (1941–2000), Dominican politician
 Roy Douglas (1924–2020), British Liberal politician and academic
 Samuel J. Douglas (1812–1873), American politician and jurist
 Stephen A. Douglas (1813–1861), American politician
 Tommy Douglas (1904–1986), Canadian politician, Premier of Saskatchewan, and father of Shirley Douglas
 Walburga Habsburg Douglas (born 1958), Austrian-Swedish politician, member of the Swedish parliament since 2006
 Walter Douglas (governor) (1670–1739), Leeward Islands
 William Bloomfield Douglas (1822–1906), Australian public servant and naval officer
 Sir William Douglas, 4th Baronet of Kelhead, MP for Dumfries Burghs
 William Douglas (died 1821) of Almorness, British MP
 William Douglas (Northern Ireland politician) (1923–2013), unionist politician in Northern Ireland
 William Lewis Douglas (1845–1924), American businessman and politician
 Lord William Douglas (William Robert Keith Douglas, 1783–1859), British MP
 Chief Alabo Graham-Douglas (1939–2022), Nigerian politician
 Aretas Akers-Douglas, 1st Viscount Chilston (1851–1926), British statesman and politician
 Aretas Akers-Douglas, 2nd Viscount Chilston (1876–1947), British diplomat
 Bruce Douglas-Mann (1927–2000), British politician
 Edward Douglas-Pennant, 1st Baron Penrhyn (1800–1886), Scottish landowner in Wales, and politician
 Edward Douglas-Pennant, 3rd Baron Penrhyn (1864–1927), British Conservative politician
 Edward Douglas-Scott-Montagu, 3rd Baron Montagu of Beaulieu (1926–2015), a British Conservative politician 
 Henry Douglas-Scott-Montagu, 1st Baron Montagu of Beaulieu (1832–1905), a British Conservative Party politician
 James Douglas-Hamilton, Baron Selkirk of Douglas (born 1942), Scottish nobleman, Conservative politician
 John Douglas-Scott-Montagu, 2nd Baron Montagu of Beaulieu (1826–1929), a British Conservative politician
 Lord Malcolm Douglas-Hamilton (1919–1964), Scottish nobleman and politician
 Walter Francis John Montagu Douglas Scott, 9th Duke of Buccleuch (1923–2007), Scottish Peer, politician and landowner
 William Montagu Douglas Scott, 6th Duke of Buccleuch (1831–1914), Scottish Member of Parliament

Sport

 Allan Douglas (born 1958), Bermudian cricketer
 Allan Douglas (born 1987), Bermudian cricketer
 Andy Douglas (born 1978), American professional wrestler
 Angus Douglas (1889–1918), Scottish international footballer
 Archibald Hugh "Toots" "Tootsie" Douglas (1885–1972),American college football and baseball player
 Anthony Douglas (born 1985), British Olympic speed skater
 Atle Douglas (born 1968), Norwegian athlete
 Barry Douglas (footballer) (born 1989), Scottish footballer
 Billy Douglas (rugby player) (1863–1945), Welsh international rugby player
 Bob Douglas (1882–1979), US-American sports manager, founder of the New York Renaissance
 Bobby Douglas (born 1942), American Olympian wrestler
 Bobby Douglass (born 1947), American football player
 Bruce Douglas (rugby union) (born 1980), Scottish rugby union footballer
 Bryan Douglas (born 1934), English footballer
 C. A. Douglas (1905–2000), American football coach
 C.H. "Pickles" Douglas (1886–1954), English cricketer and boxing referee
 Caimin Douglas (born 1977), Dutch sprinter
 Chris Douglas (born 1989), Bermudian cricketer
 Colin Douglas (born 1962), Scottish footballer
 Darl Douglas (born 1979), Dutch footballer
 Dave Douglas (golfer) (1918–1978), American professional golfer
 David Douglas (fighter) (born 1982), American mixed martial artist (also known as "Tarzan" Douglas")
 David Douglas (rower) (born 1947), Australian rower
 Desmond Douglas (born 1955), British table tennis player
 Dewayne Douglas (1931–2000), American football player
 Florence Douglas, Trinidadian cricketer
 Gabby Douglas (born 1995), American gymnast
 Glenn Douglas (1928–2017), Canadian Football League player
 Guillermo Douglas (1909–1967), Uruguayan Olympic rower
 Harry Douglas (born 1984), American footballer
 Hugh Douglas (American football) (born 1971), American NFL football player
 Jack Douglas (ice hockey) (1930–2003), Canadian ice hockey defenceman
 James Douglas (Buster Douglas), born 1960), American heavyweight boxer
 James Douglas (cricketer) (1870–1958), English cricketer
 Jason Douglas (boxer) (born 1980), Canadian boxer
 Jimmy Douglas (American soccer) (1898–1972), American soccer goalkeeper
 Jimmy Douglas (Canadian soccer) (born 1948), Scottish-Canadian footballer and coach
 Jimmy Douglas (Scottish footballer) (1859–1919), Scottish footballer
 John Douglas (rugby union) (born 1934), Scottish rugby player
 John Douglas (sportsman) (born 1951), Australian footballer and cricketer
 Johnny Douglas (1882–1930), English cricketer
 Jon Douglas (1936–2010), American tennis player
 Jonathan Douglas (born 1981), Irish football player
 Kane Douglas (born 1989), Australian rugby union footballer 
 Katherine Douglas (rower) (born 1989), British rower
 Katie Douglas (basketball) (born 1979), American Women's National Basketball Association player
 Keith Douglas (curler), Scottish curler
 Kent Douglas (1936–2009), Canadian ice hockey player
 Laura Douglas (artist) (1886–1962), American painter
 Laura Douglas (athlete) (born 1983), Welsh hammer thrower
 Luke Douglas (born 1986), Australian rugby league footballer
 Mark Douglas (born 1968), New Zealand cricketer
 Marques Douglas (born 1977), American footballer
 Marshall Douglas (born 1940), Scottish golfer
 Nathan Douglas (born 1982), British triple jumper
 Otis Douglas (1911–1989), American football player
 Phil Douglas (baseball) (1890–1952), American baseball player
 :no:Quincy Douglas (born 1975), British-born Norwegian sprinter
 Rab Douglas (born 1972), Scottish football goalkeeper
 Rasul Douglas (born 1994), American football player
 René R. Douglas (born 1967), Panamanian jockey
 Robert Douglas (American football) (born 1982), American football player
 Robert Noel Douglas (1868–1957), English cricketer and priest
 Rowley Douglas (born 1977), British Olympic rower
 Ruben Douglas (born 1979), Panamanian-American professional basketball player.
 Sean Douglas (born 1972), New Zealand association football player
 Shane Douglas (born 1964), American professional wrestler
 Steve Douglas (darts player) (born 1977), English darts player
 Steve Douglas (skateboarder), British skateboarder, company owner and industry mogul
 Struan Douglas (born 1966), Scottish Rugby League International
 Stuart Douglas (born 1978), English football player
 Taz Douglas (born 1984), Australian race driver
 Toney Douglas (born 1986), American professional basketball player
 Troy Douglas (born 1962), Dutch sprinter
 Whetu Douglas (born 1991), New Zealand rugby union player
 Ian Akers-Douglas (1902–1952), English cricketer
 Thomas Douglas-Powell (born 1992), Australian volleyball player

Science

Biology
 Claude Gordon Douglas (1882–1963), British physiologist
 David Douglas (1799–1834), Scottish botanist
 Virginia Douglas (1927–2017), Canadian psychologist and emeritus professor at McGill University

Earth sciences
 R. J. W. Douglas (1920–1979), Canadian geologist

Engineering
 C. H. Douglas (1879–1952), Scottish engineer and pioneer of the social credit concept
 Donald Wills Douglas Sr. (1892–1981), American aircraft industrialist

Mathematics
 Jesse Douglas (1897–1965), American mathematician and professor of mathematics
 Ronald G. Douglas (1938–2018), American mathematician

Physics
 David Douglass, American physicist
 James Douglas (physician) (1675–1742), Scottish physician and anatomist
 Michael R. Douglas, American physicist at Rutgers University

Other scientists
 A.S. Douglas (1921–2010), British professor of computer science
 John William Douglas (1814–1905), English entomologist
 Mary Douglas (1921–2007), British anthropologist
 Vibert Douglas aka A. Vibert Douglas (1894–1988), Canadian astronomer and the first Canadian woman to become an astrophysicist
 Iain Douglas-Hamilton (born 1942), British zoologist known for his study of elephants

Religion

 Archibald Douglas, Parson of Douglas (b. before 1540 – d. after 1587), Parson, Senator and Ambassador 
 Reverend Lord Archibald Edward Douglas (1850–1938), Catholic priest and orphanage manager
 Rt. Rev. the Hon. Arthur Gascoigne Douglas (1827–1905), Bishop of Aberdeen and Orkney
 Edward Douglas (bishop) (1901–1967), Scottish Roman Catholic bishop
 Gavin Douglas (1474–1522), Scottish poet and bishop
 George Douglas (priest) (1889–1973)
 Gerald Douglas (1875–1934), Bishop of Nyasaland
 Gordon Douglas (monk), Bhikkhu monk
 Henry Alexander Douglas (1821–1875), bishop
 The Very Rev Hugh Osborne Douglas (1911–1986), Honorary Chaplain to the Queen
 Ian Douglas (born 1958), bishop of the Episcopal Church in Connecticut. 
 John Douglas (archbishop of St Andrews) (c. 1494 – 1574) 
 John Douglas (bishop of Salisbury) (1721–1807), Scottish man of letters and Anglican bishop
 Lloyd C. Douglas (1877–1951), American minister and author
 Philip Douglas 1758-1822), British priest and academic
 Ranuccio Scotti Douglas (1597–1659), Italian Bishop
 Robert Douglas (minister) (1594–1674), Scottish minister
 Robert Douglas (bishop) (died 1716), Scottish churchman
 Robert Noel Douglas (1868–1957), English cricketer and priest
 Valentin Douglas (died 1598), Bishop of Laon and Peer of France
 Vernon Francis Douglas (1910–1943), New Zealand priest
 Wilfrid Douglas (1917–2004), missionary, linguist and translator
 William Douglas (priest) (1769?–1819), Archdeacon of Wilts

Other fields
 Alexander Douglas-Douglas (1843–1914), Australian inspector of police and explorer
 Alan Douglas (journalist) (born 1951), Scottish journalist and former broadcaster
 Ben Elbert Douglas Sr. (1894–1981), American businessman who had an airport named for his wife, Charlotte
 Betto Douglas (c. 1772 – ?), slave on the British Colony of St. Kitts
 Catherine Douglas, later "Kate" Barlass, 15th-century lady-in-waiting to the Queen of Scotland
 Charlie Douglas (Charles Edward Douglas), New Zealand explorer, surveyor, and Royal Geographical Society Gill Memorial Prize winner (1840–1916)
 David Douglas (1823–1916), Scottish publisher
 David C. Douglas (1898–1982), British historian
 David Douglas, Lord Reston (1769–1819), Adam Smith's heir
 Frank L. Douglas, Guyanese American medical doctor.
 George Douglas of Longniddry (active 1580–1610), Scottish landowner and courtier
 James Douglas (journalist) (1867–1940), British newspaper editor, author and critic
 J. Archibald Douglas (born 1866), first professor of English and history at Government College, Agra
 James Sandilands Douglas (1872–1957), Mayor of Dunedin
 James W. B. Douglas (1914–1992), British social researcher
 Jane Douglas (c. 1700 – 1762), London brothel keeper
 Janet Douglas, 17th-century Scottish woman who claimed to have second sight
 Jennifer Douglas (born 1964), American writer/producer and activist. 
 John E. Douglas (born 1945), FBI agent and criminal profiler
 Josepha Williams Douglas (1860–1938), also known as Josepha Williams, American physician
 Kenneth George (Ken) Douglas (1934–2022), New Zealand trade union leader
 Linda Douglass, former director of communications for the White House Office of Health Reform
 Malcolm Douglas, 8th Laird of Mains
 Margaret Elizabeth Douglas (1934–2008), English television producer and executive
 Mark Douglas, professor of Christian ethics at Columbia Theological Seminary
 Michael Dutton Douglas (1945–1963), American road accident victim
 Robert Douglas, Provost of Lincluden, landowner, courtier, and administrator
 Sir Robert Douglas, 6th Baronet (Robert Douglas of Glenbervie, 1694–1770), Scottish genealogist
 Sir Robert Kennaway Douglas (1838–1913), Keeper of the British Museum's Department of Oriental Printed Books and Manuscripts 
 Robert M. Douglas (doctor) (born 1936), Chairman of Australia 21
 Sandy Douglas (1921–2010), British professor of computer science
 Stephen Douglas (journalist), British journalist
 Sue Douglas (born 1957), British media executive and former newspaper editor
 Susan J. Douglas, American feminist academic, columnist, and cultural critic
 Walter Douglas, Scottish drug trafficker
 William Alexander Binny "Alec" Douglas (born 1929), Canadian naval historian
 William Douglas (died 1791), Scottish sea captain
 William Douglas of Whittingehame (c. 1540 – 1595), Senator of the College of Justice at Edinburgh, and a Royal conspirator.
 Alexandre-Pierre de Mackensie-Douglas or Mackenzie-Douglas, baron de Kildin (1713–1765), French chargé d'affaires in St Petersburg 
 Belinda Douglas-Scott-Montagu, Baroness Montagu of Beaulieu (1932–2022), British embroiderer
 Francisco Antonio Gregorio Tudela van Breugel-Douglas (born 1955), Peruvian career diplomat
 Ian Douglas-Wilson (1912–2013), British physician and editor of The Lancet

Counts Douglas in continental Europe
 Field Marshal Robert Douglas, Count of Skenninge
 Rosita Spencer-Churchill, Duchess of Marlborough née Douglas
 Count Gustaf Archibald Siegwart Douglas (born 1938), Swedish businessman and politician
 Count Vilhelm Archibald Douglas (1883–1960), Swedish nobleman and soldier

See also
 Douglass (surname)

References

Scottish toponymic surnames
Anglicised Scottish Gaelic-language surnames
Surnames of Lowland Scottish origin
English-language surnames
House of Douglas and Angus